Inchtavannach, is one of the larger islands in Loch Lomond.

Geography 
Inchtavannach faces the settlement of Aldochlay. Bandry Bay separates the island from the mainland, just south of Luss. According to Rev. Wilson, the island is "comparatively steep and lofty, mostly covered with natural oak". A southern summit reaches  in height.

History 

It is thought that St Kessog was killed here.

It was once the site of a monastery, giving rise to its translated name of 'Monk's Isle'. A large house has stood on the site of the monastery since 1760. The island is predominantly wooded. It is here that the monks rang the bell to the call of prayer.

Roe Deer are recorded to have lived here. Sir James Colquhoun built a winding path up to the summit in the 17th century.

The poets Samuel Taylor Coleridge and William Wordsworth, together with Wordsworth's sister Dorothy, visited in August 1803.

The producer of Take the High Road Brian Mahoney lived in a house on the island for ten years.

Footnotes

External links

 https://web.archive.org/web/20080909125721/http://www.loch-lomond.net/islands/inchtavannach.html
 https://web.archive.org/web/20100812225111/http://www.lochlomond-islands.com/page63.html

Tavannach
Sites of Special Scientific Interest in Scotland
Islands of Argyll and Bute